Williamson House may refer to:
James Spullock Williamson House, Sandy Ridge, AL, listed on the National Register of Historic Places (NRHP)
Williamson House (Little Rock, Arkansas), NRHP-listed
Williamson-Maley-Turner Farm, Jefferson, GA, listed on the NRHP in Georgia
Williamson House (Monroe, Georgia), listed on the NRHP in Georgia
A. J. Williamson House, Hilo, HI, listed on the NRHP in Hawaii
Roy Williamson House, Edwardsville, KS, listed on the NRHP in Kansas
Williamson–Russell–Rahilly House, Lake City, MN, listed on the NRHP in Minnesota
Williamson House (Goshen, New Hampshire), listed on the NRHP in New Hampshire
Williamson House (Louisburg, North Carolina), listed on the NRHP in North Carolina
Elmwood (Grafton, North Dakota), NRHP-listed, also known as Williamson House
Mrs. B.F. Williamson House, Darlington, SC, listed on the NRHP in South Carolina
Thomas Williamson House, Eagleville, TN, listed on the NRHP in Tennessee
E. D. Williamson House, Abilene, TX, listed on the NRHP in Texas